Akhilbandhu Ghosh (20 October 1920 – 20 March 1988) was a Bengali male singer from Kolkata, West Bengal, India. He is considered as one of the greatest exponents of Bengali classical based vocal music.

Early years
Akhilbandhu Ghosh was born to Sri Bamandas Ghosh and Smt. Manimala Ghosh of Kolkata. In the early years he was a shy and introvert boy. He studied in Bhabanipur Nasiruddin Memorial School of Kolkata. Hemanta Mukherjee was one of his close friends since his childhood days. He received the first lessons in music from his maternal uncle Sri Kalidas Guha. Later he took lessons from Nirapada Mukhopadhyay, Tarapada Chakraborty and Chinmoy Lahiri.

Personal life
He married Dipali Ghosh in 1947 and led a very happy married life. Dipali was Akhilbandhu’s disciple and a noted singer too. The childless couple devoted their life in teaching classical based vocal music to hundreds of disciples in their house located at 25, Turf Road, Bhabanipur, Kolkata.

Career
Akhilbandhu published his first album in 1947 containing two songs in 78 RPM record; Ekti kusum jaabe and Amar kanone phutechhilo phul, though some of his unpublished songs were recorded much earlier. He was unparalleled in modern classical based Bengali songs and recorded many songs which became very popular. Some of these are: ‘আজি চাঁদিনি রাতি গো’ (Aji chadini rati go), ‘ওই যে আকাশের গায়ে, দূরের বলাকা ভেসে যায়’ (Oi je akasher gaye, durer balaka vese jay), ‘শিপ্রা নদীর বুকে সন্ধ্যা নামিল হায়’ (Shipra nadir buke sandhya namil hay), ‘তোমার ভুবনে ফুলের মেলা’ (Tomar bhubane fuler mela) etc.

For several years he was associated with the Bengal Music College, founded by Nanigopal Bhattacharya in 1940.

Discography
List of all songs sung or composed by Akhilbandhu Ghosh (in alphabetical order)

Legacy
Akhilbandhu Ghosh's songs had become synonymous with the romantic ode in Bengali. Kabir Suman, an artist who initiated New wave in Bengali modern songs, mentioned Akhilbandhu Ghosh in one of his compositions of 1970, বয়স আমার মুখের রেখায় (Bayas amar mukher rekhay), where it was said,

Death
On March 20, 1988, Akhilbandhu came back from Andal attending a musical soiree, feeling unwell. He was admitted to P G Hospital first, and shifted to Sambhunath Pandit Hospital. He breathed his last in the afternoon, survived by his wife.

References 

1920 births
1988 deaths
Hindustani singers
Indian Hindus
Indian classical musicians of Bengal
Indian male composers
Bengali musicians
Bengali singers
University of Calcutta alumni
Music of Bengal
20th-century male musicians
Singers from Kolkata